World version W5 (W5 professional kickboxing) is a sports promotion of Russian origin with headquarters in Bratislava, Slovakia, and Moscow, Russia. They also have representatives in Prague (Czech Republic), Almere (Netherlands), Serbia and Croatia. W5 holds professional kickboxing events across Russia and Europe with future events planned for North and South America.

W5 was established in 2007, when Sergey Chepinoga organized the very first event in Budva, Montenegro at a football stadium. The event was a success and thus began W5 in the world of kickboxing. To date W5 has promoted more than 40 kickboxing events in locations like Prague (the Czech Republic), Vienna (Austria), Bratislava, Prievidza, Zvolen (Slovakia), Zagreb and Dubrovnik (Croatia), Ingolstadt (Germany), Budva (Montenegro), Minsk (Belarus), Moscow, Ryazan, Oryol, Kalyazin and other Russian cities.

Events

W5 History

W5 background and the first tournament 
July 5, 2007 at the rented football stadium located directly on the shores of Budva, Montenegro, W5 held its first kickboxing event called "Rame uz rame" (Serb.) (Eng. "Shoulder to shoulder"). The tournament was attended by about 5,000 spectators. The main theme of the event was "Russia Vs. Balkan countries".

Formally the tournament in Budva was held before the official registration of W5. However, this tournament is considered as World Version W5's first ever event.

W5 structure 
After its inaugural tournament in Budva, Sergey Chepinoga decided become independent and organize all tournaments without involving third-party promotional companies. This is why the W5 promotion company "Shoulder to Shoulder" (in Russian "Plechom k Plechu") was established and for some period carried out all the matchmaking for W5 events. As of 2016 W5 and Shoulder to Shoulder split into two separate entities with W5 organizing all the events and matchmaking outside of Russia, while Shoulder to Shoulder organizes the yearly W5 KITEK event in honor of Yuri Stupenkov in Moscow, Russia.
 
Sergey Chepinoga is the president of W5 and matchmaker for all W5 events.

Early tournaments  
The first W5 tournaments were held under K-1 rules with some additional rules from "Bars," which are based on the Russian army combat system being implemented.  Over the years, W5 has developed its own rules, which are now used at all W5 events.

World version W5 in 2016
In 2016 World version W5 will put on seven professional kickboxing tournaments, four of which will be conducted as a special series called "W5 European league". A significant part of all the events scheduled in Europe.
There was one event conducted in Russia on April 23 called W5 Grand Prix KITEK during which the famous Russian athlete Alexander Stetsurenko won the W5 world championship belt in the weight category up to 81 kg, he defeated the longtime principal opponent Errol Koning of the Netherlands by KO.

W5's 2017 Summer Boot Camp 
From August 4-14 W5 held its first ever Summer Boot Camp in Novi Sad, Serbia.  The event brought together some of the world's top trainers and fighters.  The trainers who led the camp were Nathan "Carnage" Corbett, Mike Van Itterzon, Andrey Chadin and Misa Baculov.  The fighters who trained alongside guests were Darryl "K.O. Specialist" Sichtman, Vlad "Diamond" Tuinov, Andrej "AK-47" Kedves, Vladimir Idranyi,  Miran "Slovenian Rocky" Fabjan, and Cosmo "Good Boy" Alexandre.   The event included 3 trainings per day and was open to professional kickboxers, amateur kickboxers and people who just want a hard core workout.  As an added benefit for fighters who attended the camp there were sparring sessions, and based on the results, one professional fighter was guaranteed a contract to fight in a future W5 tournament. The fighter who received the guaranteed contract was Markus Ehrenhofer from Vienna, Austria.

World version W5 in 2017 
Already the year has seen two tournaments take place.  In February W5 held its annual W5 KITEK event in Moscow, Russia.  The event was highly received with Vlad Tuinov once again showing he is the man to beat at 72.5kg with his brutal KO of Ali Cakir.  The highlight of the night saw legendary fighter Giorgio Petrosyan defeat Artem Pashporin by unanimous decision to win W5's World Championship Title at 71kg.  On April 8th W5 held their second event of the year in Dubrovnik, Croatia.  It was a smaller event than usual for W5 with only 6 fights on the card, however the highlight of the night was Milan "Minci" Pales KO of Luka Tomic and Vlad "Diamond" Tuinov's defeat of Massaro Glunder in the main event to add W5's 72.5kg Intercontinental title to his 71kg W5 European title.  With 2017 not yet over W5 plans on holding four more events.  There was also a Summer Boot Camp held from August 4-14 in Novi Sad, Serbia, where W5  organized some of the top trainers and fighters to come take part.  In addition all fighters who attended took part in sparring with the chance for one fighter to sign a contract to fight in a future W5 tournament.  Also on the card for 2017 are the events in Koper, Slovenia on September 16th, November 11 in Kosice, Slovakia, and the final tournament of the year on December 22nd, in Split, Croatia.  

On September 16 at W5's "Legends Collide, in Koper, Slovenia, all eyes were on Andrej "AK-47" Kedves as he fought for his 6th straight victory at W5 events. With his victory he will finally get his title fight in Kosice, Slovakia on November 11th. Also, of note was Vlad's dominant performance over the tough-as-nails Rhassan Muhareb with a 4th Rd. KO by liver punch. Vlad successfully defended is 71kg W5 European Title. In the final bout, Slovenian legend, Miran "Slovenian Rocky" Fabjan defeated Bosina and Herzegovinian legend Dzevad "BH Machine" Poturk by unanimous decision. Miran dominated the three rounds making the decision quite easy.  

For the rest of the year, W5 has one more events planned. November 11 will reunite W5 and Rebuy Stars for a continuation of their hit series "Fortune Favors the Brave".  The event will be the official grand opening of Rebuy Stars newest casino in Kosice, Slovakia. Andrej "AK-47" Kedves is expected to have his shot at a title on this date.  Ondrej Hutnik, Miran Fabjan, and Vladimir Idranyi are all expected to be on the card.

World Version W5 in 2018 
W5 has started working on their plans for 2018. They are expected to hold up to 12 tournaments next year, which will be the most in their 10 year history. Plans include a fight early on in the Netherlands, with later fights being held in the United States, Russia, Austria, Slovakia, Slovenia and Croatia.

Competition rules of the W5

W5 Fighter Series  
Over the years W5 has taken the best rules from different sports and created their own set of rules.  W5 rules are to be followed under the banner of "Championship of Five Continents." The main principle behind W5's rules is to create a transparent guideline to how fighter's are selected.  In order to determine the strongest athletes, fighters must go through a series of W5 fights throughout the year. If their performance is deemed high enough a fighter has the chance to fight for a W5 world title in the final tournament. Since 2014 many tournaments have been called "W5 Grand Prix" which also includes name of the city where the event was organized in and the slogan which the tournament is held under (e.g W5 Grand Prix Vienna Winner's Energy).

Rounds 
Regular fights are three rounds of three minutes each. If the score is tied at the end of the third round the supervising judge may award an extra round to determine the winner.  If an extra round is awarded the scores of the previous three rounds are voided and only the result of the fourth round will be considered. Title fights, which include W5 World Champion, W5 Intercontinental Champion, and W5 European Champion are five rounds. The break between rounds is one minute.

Scoring system  
W5 uses the standard 10 point scoring system. There are three judges that score each bout.  A superviser oversees the judging and makes all final decisions where one is deemed necessary. Round winner gets 10 points, the loser gets nine points or less. A tie for each round is possible.

The main rules  
 NO twisting and/or throwing
 NO clinching longer than one second 
 "Backfisting" is allowed
 One punch can be thrown after grabbing/catching an opponents leg
 Kneeing is allowed
 One knee is allowed during a clinch
 Three knockdown rule is in effect
 NO hitting below the belt
 NO hitting in the back of the head or spine
 NO elbows
 NO kidney punches

Weight categories 
Male

Super heavyweight : above 235 lb (above 106.8 kg)

Heavyweight : 215.1 - 235 lb (97.8 - 106.8 kg)

Light heavyweight : 195.1 - 215 lb (88.7 - 97.7 kg)

Super cruiserweight : 186.1 - 195 lb (84.6 - 88.6 kg)

Cruiserweight : 179.1 - 186 lb (81.5 - 84.5 kg)

Light cruiserweight : 172.1 - 179 lb (78.3 - 81.4 kg)

Super middleweight : 165.1 - 172 lb (75.1 - 78.2 kg)

Middleweight : 159.1 - 165 lb (72.4 - 75 kg)

Light middleweight : 153.1 - 159 lb (69.6 - 72.3 kg)

Super welterweight : 147.1 - 153 lb (66.9 - 69.5 kg)

Welterweight : 142.1 - 147 lb (64.59 - 66.8 kg)

Light welterweight : 137.1 - 142 lb (62.31 - 64.54 kg)

Super lightweight : 132.1 - 137 lb (60.04 - 62.27 kg)

Lightweight : 127.1 - 132 lb (57.77 - 60 kg)

Female weight categories 54, 57, and 65 kg.

Ring 
The W5 ring consists of a 5x5 square that sits inside a circle, where the circle represents infinity and a path of continuous self-development while the square symbolizes equality and justice. Such symbolism is intended to be memorable for the fighters and spectators who identify with W5's values.

Gloves and Protective Equipment 
During the bout and depending on the weight class fighters must use eight- or ten-ounce gloves and mandatory protective gear such as mouth guard and protective bandage for groin.

Current Champions 
   Giorgio Petrosyan, W5 World champion in up to 71 kg division
  Cosmo Alexandre, W5 World champion, 75 kg
  Alim Nabiyev, W5 European champion, 77 kg
  Agron Preteni, W5 European champion, 85 kg
  Alexander Stetsurenko, W5 world champion, 81 kg
  Massaro Glunder, W5 European champion, 72,5 kg
  Julia Berezikova, World Champion, 56 kg
  Dzhabar Askerov, European Champion, 71 kg
  Sergei Kharitonov, World Champion, over 90 kg
  Vladislav Tuinov, European Champion, 71 kg, Intercontinental Champion, 72.5 kg

Notable participants 
   Giorgio Petrosyan
  Artem Pashporin
  Chris Ngimbi
  Shemsi Beqiri 
  Alim Nabiev
  Cătălin Moroșanu
  Andrei Stoica
 Dzevad Poturak
 Ekaterina Vandaryeva

Current & Past Champions of World Version W5 (* next to a name indicates past champion) 

  Alexei Papin
  Alexander Stetsurenko
  Alim Nabiev
  Artem Pashporin
  Batu Khasikov (retired in March 2014)
  Cosmo Alexandre 
  Darryl Sichtman
  Dmitry Grafov
  Dmitry Shakuta
  Dmitry Varec
  Dzhabar Askerov
  Dzhemi De Vris
   Giorgio Petrosyan
  Julia Berezikova
  Konstantin Serebrennikov
  Massaro Glunder
  Max Shalnev 
  *Mike Zambidis
  Pavel Zhuravlev
  Roman Mailov
  Rudolf Durica
  Sergei Kharitonov 
 ,  Sergio Wielzen
  Vladimír Moravčík
  Vlad Tuinov
  Yury Zhukovsky

References 

Sports organizations established in 2007
2012 establishments in Russia
Sports organizations of Russia
Kickboxing organizations
Kickboxing in Russia